Haim Farhi (also known as Haim "El Mu'allim" lit. "The Teacher"), (1760 – August 21, 1820) was an adviser to the governors of the Galilee in the days of the Ottoman Empire. Among the Jews he was known as Hakham Haim, because of his Talmudic learning.

Farhi was chief advisor to Ahmad al-Jazzar of Acre, whose whims included blinding Farhi and leaving him physically scarred. Until his assassination in 1820, instigated by Farhi's own protege Abdullah Pasha, Farhi was the financial vizier and de facto ruler of Acre. After the murder, Abdullah Pasha ordered Farhi's body cast into the sea and confiscated all his property. Two of Farhi's brothers, Soliman and Rafael, living in Damascus, organized a siege against Abdullah Pasha in Acre to exact revenge.

Historical background 
After the Ottoman conquest of the Levant from the Mamluks in 1516, Galilee became part of its empire. Vast areas of Asia, North Africa and Southeastern Europe were ruled almost autonomously by local governors. The Levant in particular, split into numerous feuding power centers.

Rule over the 'Sanjak of Acre' (roughly present-day northern Israel) was supposed to derive from the authority of the Damascus governorate and its Walis. In the 18th century, a powerful local leader, Zahir al-Umar, effectively severed ties with the empire and initiated widespread reforms, improving road infrastructure and security, and encouraging Christian and Jewish merchants to settle in the area and revive commerce.

After the Treaty of Kuchuk-Kainarji was signed with Russia on July 21, 1774, Sultan Abdul Hamid I sought to reassert Turkish sovereignty by attacking Dhaher and blockading the port of Acre. His troops rose in revolt and murdered their leader. In 1775 a Turkish officer, the Bosnian Mameluk Ahmad al-Jazzar took over, and the Turks regained control over the northern areas of the land.

Zahir al-Umar actively encouraged Jewish resettlement and personally invited Hayyim ben Jacob Abulafia of İzmir to settle in the Galilee. The rabbi, born in Hebron, then part of the Jerusalem Mutassariflik (Governorate/District), returned in 1740 and was received with full honours by Zahir. He settled in Tiberias, which was restored from its ruinous state. An impressive synagogue was built, roads were constructed, and Jewish agricultural settlements were founded at Pekiin, Shefa-'Amr, and Kafr Yasif. These policies continued under Ahmad al-Jazzar.

The existence of a strong local authority enforced the law and prevented Bedouin banditry on the roads. Zahir was one of the most tolerant and efficient local leaders and meted out justice equally to Muslim, Christian and Jew. This was the case in the days of Zahir and al-Jazzar who transformed the Galilee into a region that attracted both Arabs from Syria and Lebanon, and Jews from the east and west.

Adviser to al-Jazzar 

Haim Farhi was born to a respected and ancient Jewish family in Damascus. His father Saul had established a banking business that flourished to the extent that it expanded to control Syria's finances, banking and foreign trade for nearly a century. Together with other family members, Farhi worked as a financial agent in the Damascus district. Contemporary sources often mention the family as being the "real rulers of Syria".

They may also have mediated between the Jewish community and the authorities, trying to alleviate the tax burden placed on the Jews of Safed. Farhi succeeded his father as banker of the ruler of Damascus. He gained extensive influence with the Turkish government and became the adviser to Ahmad al-Jazzar, ruler of Acre. This was probably due to his intrigues that led to the execution of the previous advisor, Mikhail Sakruj, a Christian merchant from Shefa-'Amr.

Al-Jazzar was a violent and cruel ruler, which is evidenced from his title 'al-Jazzar' meaning 'The Butcher'. He would often find pretext to lash out in savage assaults. He had Farhi's eye plucked out, cut off the tip of his nose, and severed his left ear. (A famous illustration from the time shows al-Jazzar sitting in judgment in front of his Jewish adviser, who is wearing an eye patch.)

Defeating Napoleon's siege 

It was during the reign of al-Jazzar, in 1799, that the French general and future Emperor Napoleon Bonaparte tried to conquer the Damascus governorate. In February Napoleon and his army arrived from the south, captured Jaffa and massacred 2,000 Turkish prisoners. They then moved north, captured Haifa and the Jezreel Valley and laid siege to Acre. Al-Jazzar's troops, refusing to surrender, withstood the siege for one and a half months. A British naval force under the command of Admiral Sidney Smith came to the town's defense, and an artillery expert from the fleet, Antoine DePhelipoux, redeployed against Napoleon's forces artillery pieces which the British had intercepted from the French at sea.

Farhi played a key role in the city's defense. As al-Jazzar's adviser and right-hand man, he directly supervised how the battle against the siege was run. At the culmination of the assault, the besieging forces managed to make a breach in the walls. After suffering many casualties to open an entry-point, Napoleon's soldiers found, on trying to penetrate the city, that Farhi and DePhelipoux had, in the meantime, built a second wall, several feet deeper within the city where al-Jazzar's garden was.

Discovery of this new construction convinced Napoleon and his men that the probability of their taking the city was minimal. The siege was raised and Napoleon withdrew to Egypt.

Some hold that a statement attributed to Napoleon during the war, according to which he promised to return the land to the Jews if he were to succeed in his conquest of Palestine (Southern Syria), was meant to capture Farhi's attention and betray his master by switching his support to the French. However, Napoleon never showed any particular interest in winning over the Jews of Ottoman Syria during his campaign there, though his account of the military campaign records that a rumour among Syrian Jews had it that after Napoleon took Acre, he would go to Jerusalem and restore Solomon's temple.

Murder 

After the death of al-Jazzar in 1804, his mamluk Sulayman Pasha succeeded to the Pashalik of Akko. Under him, the Jews enjoyed, according to one traveller, 'perfect religious freedom', and were relieved of the substantial fines they were frequently compelled to pay under al-Jazzar, and were obliged to pay only the customary kharadj. Sulayman continued working with Farhi and employed him much as his own father had. Sulayman held sway over the region until his death in 1819, when he bequeathed his power to Farhi's adopted son, Abdullah Pasha ibn Ali, the orphan of a bey who had died prematurely. However, Abdullah determined to rid himself of his foster-father, Farhi. When Farhi got word of the decision, he refused to flee, believing such an action would imperil his fellow Jews in the kingdom.

On 21 August 1820, soldiers appeared at Farhi's residence in Acre, denouncing him as a traitor. They seized and strangled him to death, and ransacked his house. His family was denied permission to bury his body. The family assets were expropriated and Farhi's body was cast into the sea. The family escaped to Damascus; Farhi's wife, unable to withstand the rigours of the journey, died on the way, in Safed.

Abdullah then compelled the Jews of Acre and Safed to pay in full all the back taxes they would have owed had they not been exempted, through Farhi's good offices, from paying over the years.

Farhi's murder precipitated what one recent historian of the city called "the first, serious ... existential crisis" for Acre.

Retaliation 

When word of Farhi's murder reached Damascus, his brothers, Salomon, Raphael, and Moise, swore to avenge him. They hired Turkish officers in Damascus and Aleppo to that purpose, wrote to Chalabi Carmona, an influential Jew of Constantinople, to ask the Sultan for justice, and requested a firman to that effect. Carmona obtained from Grand Mufti of Constantinople Sheikh ul-Islam, the supreme religious authority of the Ottoman Empire, a firman requiring the governors of Damascus, Aleppo and two other pashas to lend their troops to the three brothers in their pursuance of justice against Abdullah.

In April 1821 the Farhi brothers arrived with a large army in the Akko Sanjak. They first conquered the Galilee, defeating the armies Abdullah sent to meet them, and appointing new rulers to take away his authority in every region they conquered. When they finally reached Acre, they besieged it for 14 months. During the siege, the eldest brother, Salomon, was poisoned (according to some sources, stabbed) by Abdullah's emissaries, and the surviving brothers, despairing of the siege, withdrew with their troops to Damascus.

Legacy 

Farhi's residence still stands today in Acre, but it is not open to visitors. Acre also has a square in his honour in the old sector of the city.

Notes

References 
 Avraham Yeari, "Memories of the land of Israel" (זכרונות ארץ ישראל), published by the department of youth matters of the Zionist Histadrut, 1947.

External links 
 FARHI Family History
 Haim "El Muallim" Farhi
 Les Farhi de Damas 
 Portrait of Haim Farhi
 Haim Genealogy

1760 births
1820 deaths
Ottoman military leaders of the French Revolutionary Wars
Jews in Ottoman Syria
People from Acre, Israel
Land of Israel
Assassinated people from the Ottoman Empire
People from Damascus
Jewish viziers